Seve may refer to:

People
 Seve Ballesteros (1957–2011), Spanish golfer
 Seve Benson (born 1986), English golfer
 Seve Paeniu (born 1965), Tuvaluan diplomat
 Alfred De Sève (1858-1927), Canadian violinist, composer and music educator
 Jacques de Sève (fl. 1742–1788), French illustrator
 Peter de Sève, American illustrator and animation character designer
 Lucien Sève (1926-2020), French philosopher

Other uses
 Ševe, a secret police organization in Bosnia and Herzegovina
 "Seve", a song by Tez Cadey
 Seve Dam, Turkey
 Seve Trophy, a European golf tournament, named after the Spanish golfer